Newsline World is the flagship English weeknight newscast of SMNI News Channel (SMNI) aired every weeknights at 11:00 p.m. to 12:00 a.m. (PST) on Sonshine Media Network International and SMNI's television stations throughout the Philippines. The newscast is anchored by Jean Domingo.

In February 2016, Newsline World was reformatted and moved in a new studio located at the ACQ Tower in EDSA, Guadalupe, Makati, in time for the national elections.

See also
 SMNI News Channel

External links
 Official YouTube channel

Philippine television news shows
2011 Philippine television series debuts
2020s Philippine television series
English-language television shows